Carnedd y Filiast is the name of several mountains in Wales:
Carnedd y Filiast (Glyderau) — an 821 m peak in the Glyderau
Carnedd y Filiast (Cerrigydrudion) — a 669 m peak in the Arenigs